The 1992 Bowling Green Falcons football team was an American football team that represented Bowling Green University in the Mid-American Conference (MAC) during the 1992 NCAA Division I-A football season. In their second season under head coach Gary Blackney, the Falcons compiled a 10–2 record (8–0 against MAC opponents), won the MAC championship, defeated Nevada in the Las Vegas Bowl, and outscored all opponents by a combined total of 324 to 235.

The team's statistical leaders included Erik White with 2,380 passing yards, Zeb Jackson with 730 rushing yards, and Mark Szlachcic with 834 receiving yards.

Schedule

References

Bowling Green
Bowling Green Falcons football seasons
Mid-American Conference football champion seasons
Las Vegas Bowl champion seasons
Bowling Green Falcons football